A hominid is an ape in the family Hominidae.

Hominid may also refer to:

 Hominid (novel), a 2008 novel by Klaus Ebner
 Hominid (band), an American post-punk noise band formed 
 Hominids, a 2002 novel by Robert J. Sawyer in The Neanderthal Parallax trilogy